Cahal Pech Village Resort is one of the largest hotels in San Ignacio, Belize and sits alongside the ancient Maya Ruins of Cahal Pech. The hotel has been in operation since 1995 and was founded by Daniel and Miriam Silva.

In Jan 2014, Daniel Silva, the Chairman of the hotel, installed Peter Tonti as its new CEO, Belizean writer and blogger Larry Waight as its Chief Technology Officer and Lloyd Alvarez as the Chief Reservations Manager.

References

External links

 Official website

 

Hotels in Belize
Hotels established in 1985
Hotel buildings completed in 1985
1985 establishments in Belize